Lim-Pendé is a prefecture in Central African Republic. In 2022, the prefecture had a population of around 442,151. The size of Lim-Pendé is 13,210 km2. Paoua is the capital of the prefecture.

History 
Lim-Pendé was created on 10 December 2020. Previously it was part of Ouham-Pende.

Administration 
Lim-Pendé is divided into five sub-prefectures and 14 communes:

References 

Prefectures of the Central African Republic
States and territories established in 2020